is a retired Japanese freestyle swimmer who competed at the 1960 and 1964 Summer Olympics. In 1960, he won a bronze medal in the 4 × 100 m medley relay, by swimming for the Japanese team in the preliminary round. In 1964, his 4 × 100 m freestyle relay team finished in fourth place.

References

1939 births
Living people
Olympic swimmers of Japan
Swimmers at the 1960 Summer Olympics
Swimmers at the 1964 Summer Olympics
Olympic bronze medalists for Japan
Olympic bronze medalists in swimming
Japanese male freestyle swimmers
Medalists at the 1960 Summer Olympics
20th-century Japanese people